Constantin Radu may refer to:

 Constantin Radu (athlete), Romanian long-distance runner
 Constantin Radu (footballer) (1945–2020), Romanian footballer
 Constantin Radu (rower) (born 1996), Romanian rower